Tha Sala is a district (amphoe) of Nakhon Si Thammarat province, southern Thailand.

Geography
Neighboring districts are (from the south clockwise): Mueang Nakhon Si Thammarat, Phrom Khiri, Nopphitam, and Sichon. To the east is the Gulf of Thailand.

History
During the thesaphiban administrative reforms five mueang of the Nakhon Si Thammarat Kingdom were put together to form Nakhon Si Thammarat Province. These mueang were Thai Buri, Ron Ka Ro, Klai, Mo Khlan, and Noppitham. At its establishment in 1897 the district was named Klai (กลาย) and divided into the 10 tambons Tha Sala, Tha Khuen, Sa Kaeo, Klai, Thaiburi, Ka Ro, Noppitham, Hua Taphan, Mo Khlan, and Don Tako. The first district officer was Charoen (Mai Sap Nam Sakun), the district office was at the coast in Ban Paknam Thasung. In 1916 the district office was moved to tambon Tha Sala and the district was renamed accordingly.

The western part of the district was split off to form the new minor district Nopphitam in 1995.

Administration

Central administration 
Tha Sala is divided into 10 sub-districts (tambons), which are further subdivided into 110 administrative villages (mubans).

Missing numbers are now part of Nopphitam District.

Local administration 
There is one sub-district municipality (thesaban tambon) in the district:
 Tha Sala consisting of parts of sub-district Tha Sala.

There are 10 sub-district administrative organizations (SAO) in the district:
 Tha Sala consisting of parts of sub-district Tha Sala.
 Klai consisting of sub-district Klai.
 Tha Khuen consisting of sub-district Tha Khuen.
 Hua Taphan consisting of sub-district Hua Taphan.
 Sa Kaeo consisting of sub-district Sa Kaeo.
 Mokkhalan consisting of sub-district Mokkhalan.
 Thai Buri consisting of sub-district Thai Buri.
 Don Tako consisting of sub-district Don Tako.
 Taling Chan consisting of sub-district Taling Chan.
 Pho Thong consisting of sub-district Pho Thong.

References

External links
amphoe.com
http://www.thasalacity.go.th Website of Tha Sala township (Thai)

Districts of Nakhon Si Thammarat province